The hurricane cocktail is a sweet alcoholic drink made with rum, lemon juice, and either passion fruit syrup or fassionola. It is one of many popular drinks served in New Orleans. It is traditionally served in the tall, curvy eponymous hurricane glass. Disposable plastic cups are also used because New Orleans laws permit drinking in public and leaving a bar with a drink, but prohibit public drinking from glass containers.

History
Currently the oldest known references to the hurricane cocktail date the drink’s creation back to at least 1938. In 1939 in Queens, New York, it was served at the 1939-1940 New York World's fair at the "Hurricane Bar" but it’s unknown what ingredients were used to prepare the Hurricane drinks that were sold at the exhibition. The best representation of the original recipe and look of the Hurricane drink is depicted in the October- December 1938 produced/July 1939 released the Warner Bros. film Naughty But Nice, where the original hurricane drink appears to be simply lemonade or lemon juice with the addition of a generous portion of rum with little or nothing else added to it that would give it any appearance different from lemonade. If passion fruit syrup was added to the drink it would have been a clear uncolored version as the drink does not have the now iconic red color typically found in hurricanes served today. The glass the hurricane is served in is a standard high ball glass instead of the iconic "hurricane lamp" shaped glasses used today. 

Although the movie was filmed at the Warner Brothers Burbank studios in California, the story is set in New York City. The hurricane cocktail's similar appearance to ordinary lemonade plays a major role in the film’s storyline which is about tee totaling Professor Donald Hardwick (Dick Powell) who accidentally gets drunk from the cocktail in several scenes of the film because too the drink's identical look to the non-alcoholic lemonade he tends to order at social gatherings that involve people drinking cocktails. Zelda Manion (Ann Sheridan), who has discovered the professor's inability to distinguish the difference between a hurricane cocktail and a glass of lemonade, takes advantage of this in order to deliberately get him intoxicated throughout the film. The first times does this in the story is when the Professor is offered a drink by Zelda’s maid in her apartment, when he asks for a glass of lemonade; Zelda follows her maid into the kitchen and tells her to "fix up a hurricane, that's the one where you use 6 oz of rum as the base…".  When the drink comes from the kitchen it looks identical to regular lemonade and consequently the professor unknowingly gets drunk. Also, in a later nightclub scene, the professor orders lemonade from the table’s waiter and Zelda orders a hurricane knowing that the two drinks will get mixed up. The couple’s drink order can be seen at the bar several minutes later while the bartender tells the waiter who comes to collect the order “the one with the cherry is a hurricane” as he dropped a maraschino cherry onto the top of the hurricane as a garnish so that the two drinks can be told apart when served. Within a few years after the film’s release and the 1939-1940 World’s Fair exhibition in New York ended different variations of the drink began to form.

The most popular association the hurricane cocktail has today is with the Pat O' Brien's chain of bars and restaurants, and particularly their original New Orleans location creation of the passion fruit-flavored relative of the daiquiri is credited to New Orleans tavern owner Pat O'Brien.  The bar allegedly started as a speakeasy called Mr. O'Brien's Club Tipperary and the password was "storm's brewin'.

In the 1940s, O'Brien needed to create a new drink to help him get rid of all of the less-popular rum that local distributors forced him to buy before he could get a few cases of more popular liquors such as scotch and other whiskeys. He poured the concoction into hurricane lamp–shaped glasses and gave it away to sailors. The drink caught on, and it has been a mainstay in the French Quarter ever since.

See also
List of cocktails
Queen Mary (beer cocktail)

References

Cocktails with rum
Louisiana cuisine
New Orleans cocktails
Cocktails with lemon juice